Karl Thomas (March 17, 1871 – July 18, 1900) was an American sailor serving in the United States Navy during the Boxer Rebellion who received the Medal of Honor for bravery.

Biography
Thomas was born March 17, 1871, in Germany, and after entering the navy in 1895 he was sent as an Coxswain to China to fight in the Boxer Rebellion.

He died July 18, 1900, and is buried in San Francisco National Cemetery, San Francisco, California.

Medal of Honor citation
Rank and organization: Coxswain, U.S. Navy. Born: 17 March 1871, Germany. Accredited to: New York. G.O. No.: 55, 19 July 1901.

Citation:

In action with the relief expedition of the Allied forces in China 13, 20, 21, and 22 June 1900. During this period and in the presence of the enemy, Thomas distinguished himself by meritorious conduct.

See also

List of Medal of Honor recipients
List of Medal of Honor recipients for the Boxer Rebellion

References

External links

1871 births
1900 deaths
United States Navy Medal of Honor recipients
United States Navy sailors
American military personnel of the Boxer Rebellion
German-born Medal of Honor recipients
German emigrants to the United States
People from New York (state)
Boxer Rebellion recipients of the Medal of Honor